Kizhakku Karai is a 1991 Indian Tamil-language crime film written and directed by P. Vasu. The film stars Prabhu and Khushbu. It was released on 20 September 1991.

Plot 

Sekhar and Murali are best friends. Murali sacrifices his job opportunity for his friend, thus Sekhar becomes a customs officer. Thereafter, Murali returns to his native village. His cousin Mahalakshmi falls in love with him.

Ranganathan, Murali's father, works for a smuggler named Daaha for twenty-five years. When Murali discovers his father's profession, he convinces his father to quit his job. Finally, Ranganathan decides to leave this odd job but Daaha kills him for fear of reprisal. Murali decides to take revenge and becomes a smuggler as well.

Cast 

Prabhu as Murali
Khushbu as Mahalakshmi
Chandrasekhar as Sekhar
Goundamani as Raja (Jacky)
Vijayakumar as Ranganathan, Murali's father
Srividya as Janaki, Murali's mother
Vennira Aadai Moorthy as Raja's father
Mohan Natarajan as Kumar
Rocky as Michael
K. Rajpreeth as Daaha
Oru Viral Krishna Rao as Lodge manager
LIC Narasimhan
King Kong as Foreign Palli
Uday Prakash
G. M. Sundar
Dileep
Veera Pandiyan
Perumal
Radhakrishnan
Varalakshmi as Raja's mother
Babitha as Mary
Sharmili
Baby Jennifer as Murali's and Mahalakshmi's son

Soundtrack 
The soundtrack was composed by Deva, with lyrics written by Vaali.

Reception 
N. Krishnaswamy of The Indian Express stated, "The narrative does not roll credibly, the camera work is mediocre and Deva has scored a few sweet numbers" but he praised actor K. Rajpreeth's performance and the climax's message.

References

External links 
 

1990s Tamil-language films
1991 crime films
1991 films
Films directed by P. Vasu
Films scored by Deva (composer)
Indian crime films